White Collar is an American police procedural drama television series created by Jeff Eastin, starring Tim DeKay as FBI Special Agent Peter Burke and Matt Bomer as Neal Caffrey, a highly intelligent and multi-talented con artist, forger, and thief, working as both Burke's criminal informant and an FBI consultant. Willie Garson and Tiffani Thiessen also star. The show premiered on October 23, 2009, on USA Network, and aired six complete seasons, concluding on December 18, 2014.

Premise
Neal Caffrey, a renowned con artist, forger, and thief, is captured after a three-year game of cat and mouse with the FBI, specifically Special Agent Peter Burke, the head agent of the FBI’s White Collar Crimes Unit at the FBI's New York City field office. With only three months left in his four-year sentence, he escapes to look for his girlfriend, Kate. Burke once again finds Caffrey and returns him to prison. This time, Caffrey proposes a deal to help Burke apprehend dangerous white collar criminals with the FBI and also give them full time consultation in exchange for his early release from prison as part of a work-release program. After some hesitation, Burke agrees, resulting in Neal being released early from prison and working as an FBI consultant and Burke's criminal informant. They thus begin their unconventional and testy relationship as they set out to capture elusive and dangerous white collar criminals in New York City.

Cast and characters

Main characters 
 Matt Bomer as Neal Caffrey: 
 A skilled con artist, forger and thief, he is charming and intelligent. Caffrey was imprisoned after being captured by FBI Special Agent in Charge Peter Burke. Neal proposes he become an FBI consultant and Burke’s criminal informant, in exchange for early release. Burke agrees on the condition Neal wears an ankle monitor, allowing the FBI to keep a close eye on Neal's movements. Given the opportunity to build a new, honest life for himself, Neal often craves his old life, forcing him to battle with his inner saboteur.
 Tim DeKay as FBI Special Agent in Charge Peter Burke:
 A hard-working, honest FBI Special Agent, and the head of the FBI’s White Collar Crimes Unit on which Neal serves at the FBI’s New York City field office.
 Willie Garson as Mozzie: 
 Another con man and close friend of Neal, Theodore "Moz" Winters, is Neal's most trusted confidant.
 Tiffani Thiessen as Elizabeth Burke: 
 An event planner and Peter's wife. She is supportive and understanding of his work and long hours away. An intelligent woman herself, Elizabeth is able to discuss Peter's cases with him, and admires Neal's refinement.
 Marsha Thomason as FBI Special Agent Diana Berrigan (recurring, season 1; main cast, seasons 2–6):
 Previously Peter's probationary agent, Diana assists on Peter and Neal's first case together. Transferred to D.C. after her probation ends, she later returns to the investigative team in New York City. She is openly lesbian.
 Sharif Atkins as FBI Special Agent Clinton Jones (recurring, seasons 1–3; main cast, seasons 4–6):
 An ex-United States Navy Lieutenant who attended the United States Naval Academy and Peter's point man who is responsible for carrying out a variety of tasks during the team's investigations, including surveillance. He appreciates Neal's unorthodox contributions to the team.
 Hilarie Burton as Sara Ellis (recurring, seasons 2 and 4; main cast, season 3):
 An insurance investigator for Sterling Bosch, an insurance company, who testified against Neal when he was on trial, and determined to see him return to prison, she later discovers she enjoys working with him.
 Natalie Morales as FBI Special Agent Lauren Cruz (season 1): 
 A junior agent who requested a transfer to Peter's team and served on it briefly.

Recurring characters

 Diahann Carroll as June Ellington: 
 An elderly widow who meets Neal at a thrift store soon after his release from prison. June is a quick judge of character, and offers Neal her guest room. June also has a close friendship with Mozzie and is often seen talking to him or playing board games.
 James Rebhorn as FBI Special Agent in Charge Reese Hughes: 
 The agent in charge of the FBI's Manhattan White Collar Crime Unit, Hughes is supportive of Peter's use of Neal as a confidential informant. 
 Bridget Regan as Rachel Turner/Rebecca Lowe:
 An expert in ancient books, especially Mosconi's texts. Rebecca joins Neal and Mozzie in their efforts to resolve the mystery behind Mosconi's Codex and becomes Neal's new love interest.
 Gloria Votsis as Alexandra Hunter: 
 A professional thief and black market fence who was formerly romantically involved with Neal. She periodically assists with Peter and Neal's cases, but the nature of her and Neal's relationship is always somewhat of a mystery.
 Ross McCall as Matthew Keller:
 The “blue collar” version of Neal, a thief, and archrival of Neal, Keller was arrested and jailed by Peter but later escaped and tried to steal the U-boat treasure that Neal and Mozzie have.
 Alexandra Daddario as Kate Moreau: 
 Neal's missing girlfriend, who appears to be acting under the direction of a mysterious man, identifiable only by his 10-year commemorative FBI ring. She provides Neal with cryptic clues when she wants to communicate with him, and eventually prepares to reunite with Neal.
 Treat Williams as James Bennett/Samuel "Sam" Phelps: 
 A mysterious former DC cop who turns out to be Neal's father, and who was framed for murder.
 Mark Sheppard as Curtis Hagen:
 A criminal caught during the first case on which Peter and Neal worked together.
 Judith Ivey as Ellen Parker/Kathryn Hill: 
 Neal's father's former partner. She arrested Neal's father and then was put into WITSEC along with Neal and his mother.
 Noah Emmerich as FBI Special Agent Garrett Fowler: 
 A discredited agent from the Office of Professional Responsibility, his abuse of authority in pursuit of Neal and Peter eventually leads to his forced resignation. Neal believes he is responsible for Kate's death.
 Beau Bridges as FBI Special Agent Phillip Kramer:
 Peter Burke's instructor when Burke was training at the FBI Academy in Quantico, and later Burke's mentor. Kramer works in the Art Crimes Unit in Washington, D.C. He, like Neal, is an expert in art, and believes Neal is too valuable to be a free man, so plans to have Neal transferred to Washington, D.C. to work with him.
 Moran Atias as Christie:
 Diana's girlfriend. She is a physician who works at a hospital.
 Andrew McCarthy as Vincent Adler: 
 A wealthy financier who is the subject of a long con soon after Neal and Mozzie get together. Kate was working as Adler's personal assistant when Neal took a job with Adler in order to gain his confidence and get the information needed for the con. Adler taught Neal about personal style and to enjoy an expensive lifestyle.
 Titus Welliver as Senator Terrance Pratt:
 He was James's (Neal's father's) captain when he was working for the D.C. Metropolitan Police.
 Denise Vasi as Cindy:
 June's granddaughter.

Reception

For the first season, the review aggregator website Rotten Tomatoes reported a 96% approval rating with an average rating of 8/10 based on 27 reviews. The website's critical consensus reads, "Featuring clever plotting and outstanding chemistry between its leads, White Collar is a witty, briskly-paced caper series." Metacritic, which uses a weighted average, assigned a score of 79 of 100 for the season, based on reviews from 21 critics, indicating "generally favorable reviews".

For the second season, Rotten Tomatoes reported a 100% approval rating with an average score of 8/10, based on 13 reviews. The site's critical consensus reads: "White Collars second season builds on the strengths of its first, placing greater emphasis on the charismatic cast, snappy banter, and compelling crimes."

For the third season, Rotten Tomatoes reported a 100% approval rating with an average score of 8.1/10, based on 10 reviews. The site's critical consensus reads: "White Collar boasts prestige pedigree with stripped down plotting and a laser focus on relationship stakes." Metacritic assigned a score of 72 out of 100 based on 5 critics, indicating "generally favorable reviews".

For the fourth season, Rotten Tomatoes reported a 100% approval rating with an average score of 8.7/10, based on 12 reviews. The site's critical consensus reads: "White Collars fourth season keeps things moving with hefty amounts of action, intrigue, and handsomeness."

For the fifth season, Rotten Tomatoes reported a 83% approval rating with an average score of 8/10, based on 6 reviews.

For the sixth season, Rotten Tomatoes reported a 100% approval rating with an average score of 8.7/10, based on 5 reviews.

Awards and nominations
At the People's Choice Awards, White Collar was nominated in the categories of Favorite TV Obsession and Favorite Dramedy in 2011 and 2015. It was nominated for Favorite TV Cable Drama between 2012 and 2014. Matt Bomer won the award for Favorite TV Cable Actor in 2015. Diahann Carroll was nominated for Outstanding Supporting Actress in a Drama series at the Image Awards in 2012 and 2014. At the TV Guide Awards, actors Tim DeKay and Matt Bomer were both nominated for Favorite Duo in 2012. At the NewNowNext Awards, Matt Bomer was nominated in the category of Cause You're Hot in 2010. Regan Mizrahi was nominated in the category of Best Performance in a TV series - Guest Starring Young Actor at the Young Artist Awards in 2012. The pilot received a nomination for Outstanding Achievement in Casting - Television Pilot - Drama at the Casting Society of America Awards in 2010.

Seasons

Syndication
ION Television acquired the rights for syndication of White Collar in 2013 along with Burn Notice. It is the third USA Network television series to be in syndication on ION Television, along with Monk and Psych.

Possible revival 
On May 6, 2020, series creator Jeff Eastin wrote on Twitter that he "Had a great convo with Matt Bomer. We have a plan to bring #WhiteCollar back." Fox 21 Television Studios, which succeeded the now-defunct Fox TV Studios, is not working on a revival .

Home media
The first season of White Collar was released in the US as White Collar: The Complete First Season as a widescreen four-disc Region 1 DVD box set on July 13, 2010. The same set was released on July 26, 2010, in Region 2, and on August 18, 2010, in Region 4. The first season of White Collar was released on Blu-ray. The season two four-disc Region 1 DVD box set was released on June 7, 2011. White Collar: The Complete Third Season four-disc Region 1 DVD box set was released on June 5, 2012. White Collar: Season 4 DVD box set was released on October 8, 2013. White Collar: Season 5 DVD box set was released on November 4, 2014. White Collar: Season 6 DVD box set was released on May 5, 2015.

International broadcasts

References

External links

 

2009 American television series debuts
2014 American television series endings
2000s American crime drama television series
2010s American crime drama television series
2000s American police procedural television series
2010s American police procedural television series
English-language television shows
Television series by 20th Century Fox Television
Television shows set in New York City
Television shows filmed in New York (state)
USA Network original programming
Television series about the Federal Bureau of Investigation
Fraud in television